Events in the year 1887 in Norway.

Incumbents
Monarch: Oscar II
Prime Minister: Johan Sverdrup

Events

 21 August – The Norwegian Labour Party was established.

Arts and literature
Albertine i politilægens venteværelse, painting by Christian Krohg
A Country Cobbler, naturalist painting by Harriet backer
Sjur Gabriel (Hellemyrsfolket), Naturalist book written by Amalie Skram
To Venner (hellemyrsfolket), written by Amalie skram
Om Albertine, pamphlet written by Amalie Skram

Births

January to March
7 January – Ingvald Tøndel, politician (died 1952)
15 January – Charles Mackenzie Bruff, forensic chemist (died 1955)
17 January – Ola Raknes, psychoanalyst and philologist (died 1975)
30 January – Lauritz Bergendahl, Nordic skier (died 1964)
15 February – Sigurd Jørgensen, gymnast and Olympic gold medallist (died 1929)
16 February – Kristian Fjeld, politician and Minister (died 1976)
11 March – Henry Olsen, track and field athlete (died 1978)
15 March – Johanne Samueline Pedersen, politician (died 1961)
20 March – Hans Eidnes, politician (died 1962)
26 March – Yngvar Fredriksen, gymnast and Olympic gold medallist (died 1958)

April to June
2 April – Øyvind Alfred Stensrud, politician (died 1956)
4 April – Peder Morset, teacher and resistance member (died 1943)
10 April – Alf Lie, gymnast and Olympic gold medallist (died 1969)
24 April – Lars Slagsvold, veterinarian (died 1959)
28 April – Thomas Aas, sailor and Olympic gold medallist (died 1961)
3 May – Harald Halvorsen, gymnast and Olympic silver medalist (died 1965)
7 May – Olav Berntsen Oksvik, politician and Minister (died 1958)
13 May – Sverre Kornelius Eilertsen Støstad, politician and Minister (died 1959)
14 May – Petter Martinsen, gymnast and Olympic gold medallist (died 1972)
18 May – Eugen Lunde, sailor and Olympic gold medallist (died 1963)
23 May – Thoralf Skolem, mathematician (died 1963)
12 June – Laurits Grønland, politician (died 1957)
22 June – Oscar Olstad, gymnast and Olympic bronze medallist (died 1977)
25 June – Axel Henry Hansen, gymnast and Olympic bronze medallist (died 1980)

July to September
3 July – Carl Klæth, gymnast and Olympic silver medallist (died 1966)
18 July – Vidkun Quisling, army officer, politician and Minister-President of Norway, executed (died 1945)
27 July – Kristoffer Skåne Grytnes, politician (died 1965)
11 August – Adolph M. Christianson, justice of the North Dakota Supreme Court (died 1954)
12 August – Erling Falk, businessman and politician (died 1940)
19 August – Otto Monsen, track and field athlete (died 1979)
20 August – Engebret Skogen, rifle shooter and Olympic bronze medallist (died 1968)
25 August – Fartein Valen, composer and musical theorist (died 1952)
11 September – Oscar Larsen, middle distance runner (died 1975)
16 September – Knut Fixdal, road engineer and civil servant (died 1969)
18 September – Harald Gram, jurist, politician and genealogist (died 1961)
22 September – Thoralf Hagen, rower and Olympic bronze medallist (died 1979)

October to December
1 October – Anders Moen, gymnast and Olympic silver medallist (died 1966)
4 October – Francis Bull, literary historian, professor, essayist and magazine editor (died 1974)
20 October – Arne Halse, athlete and Olympic silver medallist (died 1975)
26 October – Arnfinn Heje, sailor and Olympic gold medallist (died 1958)
28 October – Friedrich Georg Nissen, civil servant (died 1969)
22 November – Knut Knutsson Steintjønndalen, Hardanger fiddle maker (died 1969)
23 November – Andreas Knudsen, sailor and Olympic silver medallist (died 1982)
7 December – Knut Olaf Andreasson Strand, politician (died 1980)
10 December – Olga Bjoner, politician and organizational leader (died 1969)

Deaths
11 March – Ludvig Mathias Lindeman, composer and organist (born 1812)
16 July – Jørgen Tandberg Ebbesen, politician (born 1812)
7 August – Harald Kolbeinson Guddal, politician (born 1798)
24 September – Leonhard Christian Borchgrevink Holmboe, priest and politician (born 1802)

See also

References